Poosapati Sanjeevi Kumaraswamy Raja (8 July 1898 – 16 March 1957) was an Indian politician who served as the last Chief Minister of Madras Presidency from 6 April 1949 to 26 January 1950 and first Chief Minister of Madras State from 26 January 1950 to 10 April 1952 and Governor of Orissa between 1954 till 1956. He was born in Rajapalayam in Tamil Nadu.

Early life
Raja was born on 8 July 1898 in Rajapalayam to Poosapati Sanjeevi Raja. His mother died when he was eight days old and his father when he was three. Raja had no brothers and sisters and was brought up by his grandmother. After schooling, Raja was connected with the Indian National Congress organisation at its every level. He took a prominent part in Panchayat organisations, local Board administration. He served as the President of Rajapalayam Union, the Panchayat court, the District Board of Ramnathapuram and the District educational Council among others. He was an uncle of military officer K.A.S. Raja.

Political and social work

The lives and writings of Annie Besant and Satyamurthy had great influence on his mind and character in his formative years. It was in 1919 that he met Mahatma Gandhi for the first time and started following with great interest the events in Gandhi's life. Gandhi's epic struggle in South Africa, the founding of the Ashram in Ahmedabad and the Champaran struggle made a profound impression on him and the utter simplicity of Mahatma's life also evoked his unbounded admiration.

In 1932, he was arrested for disobeying the unjust laws. Thus Rajapalayam gained a distinct place in political map, the credit went to Raja's lead. In 1934, Raja won central legislature for constituency comprising Tirunelveli, Madurai & Ramanathapuram. At the age of 39, he entered the Assembly as M.L.A in C. Rajagopalachari ministry successfully contesting the 1937 election.

He was elected as the leader of Madras Legislature Congress Party in 1939 defeating Dr. P. Subbaroyan by 105 to 89 in March 31, 1949 and took oath as the Premier (Chief Minister) of Tamil Nadu on April 6, 1949. Prior to becoming the Chief Minister he served as a cabinet minister under Mr. Prakasam formed in April 1946. He also served as the Governor of Orissa from 1954 to 1956.

In all the years of his life, most of Raja's wealth was spent in helping the poor and in serving public causes, particularly for the Congress movement. He was much interested in co-operative movement also. He founded Bhupathi Raju Co-operative Credit Bank, an urban bank
for the benefit of local people especially farmers named after his friend, Bhupathi Raju of Andhra Pradesh, who accompanied him in 
prison during freedom movement. He constructed the monument Congress Ponvizha Grounds (Golden Jubilee Grounds) in Rajapalayam commemorating the fifty years completion of founding of All India Congress Party in 1935.

Raja's life was one of noble activity, dedication and selfless service for the people of the country. He was a staunch proponent of the concept of "Separation of the Judiciary from the Executive". Prohibition, promotion of Khādī and Temple entry legislation were his other notable achievements. He donated his house for starting an institution of culture called "Gandhi Kalai Mandram". Rajapalayam became a great industrial centre mainly due to his drive and interest.

It was said that Raja studied in Srivilliputtur G.S. Hindu higher secondary school and thus he chose his temple as the symbol of Tamil Nadu emblem. And his successor Rajagopalachari might not have minded that the shrine of Andal was now the Madras government's symbol.

Raja died on 16 March 1957 in Madras, upon not recovering from an illness following his return from a visit to his ancestral village in Andhra Pradesh.

Commemoration
Raja has been commemorated on an Indian Postal Service stamp. P. S. Kumaraswamy Raja centenary marriage hall was opened in 1998 by then chief minister to commemorate his centenary birthday celebrations.

See also
Chief Ministers of Tamil Nadu

References

Indian National Congress politicians from Tamil Nadu
Chief Ministers of Tamil Nadu
Tamil Nadu ministers
1898 births
1957 deaths
People from Virudhunagar district
Chief ministers from Indian National Congress